Ashtray Navigations is an English experimental music group centred upon Phil Todd and active since 1991. Colloquially referred to as "Ash Nav", the group operates out of Todd's home in Stoke-on-Trent, from which he also ran the record labels Betley Welcomes Careful Drivers and, subsequently, Memoirs of an Aesthete. The project has also released music through labels such as Siltbreeze, Jewelled Antler, American Tapes, Fargone Records, Menlo Park, E.F. Tapes and Freedom From. 

Whilst the music evades easy categorisation due to variations in sound, approach and personnel, it often incorporates extended droning and lengthy guitar pieces. James Blackshaw described the Ashtray Navigations sound as "sub-aquatic synth bubble, busted-up cassette-tape hiss and distorted electric guitar hover that sounds like a mythical god banished from the realm of light and trying desperately to clamber his/her way out of a dark bottomless void where time itself stands still." The Wire's David Keenan has described Phil Todd/Ashtray Navigations as "a trashcan antidote to LaMonte Young." 

Reviewing Todd's 36th album, The Love that Whirrs, critic Larry Dolman wrote "It's a pretty mammoth piece of work – almost 80 minutes of music spread out over six heavy tracks. They tend to start as intense sun-blinding drone-fields, but if you hold on tight for a minute or two and adjust yourself to these new conditions, you'll start to notice a wealth of detail, provided by a real band of ringers. Todd has Alex Neilson (Directing Hand, accompanist with some Jandek live performances) on shimmering, fracturing percussion and Ben Reynolds on raga-style guitar and banjo. (Also, one Melanie Delaney appears on one epic track, playing reeds & tapes.) Trash drone, free skiffle, new electric raga, sun blindness music, call it what you will, this is a powerful statement."

Although Todd still records solo, most recent Ashtray Navigations titles and live shows have been undertaken by a duo of Todd and Melanie Crowley or by a trio of Todd, Crowley and one other, often Phil Legard (Xenis Emputae Travelling Band) although the line-up has also been joined at one time or another by Alex Neilson, Bill Kouligas (Family Battle Snake) and Ruaraidh Sanachan (Nackt Insecten) – the latter two can be heard on "Backstage Education" a limited four-disc document of Ash Nav's 2007 summer tour.

Their discography is extensive, with many limited releases on cassette and CDR formats: albums with a wider distribution include Four Raga Moods (which was followed-up several years later by Four More Raga Moods), The Love that Whirrs, To Your Fucking Feather'd Wings, Dirt Mummies & Bloody Amps, You Cannot Tell Cigars.... and Use Copenhagen 69 Guitars and Park Drive Circular Effects Pedals Exclusively.

Partial discography
Who's Been Rocking My Dream-Boat? (cassette, 1996)- Less Than Zero
Four Raga Moods (CD, 1997)- Betley Welcomes Careful Drivers
Use Copenhagen 69 Guitars and Park Drive Circular Effects Pedals Exclusively (LP, 1997) – Siltbreeze
End-of-the-Pier Vault (7", 2000) – Tonschact Records
Plaster Projection Instruction Record (12", 2000) – Menlo Park Recordings
Last Kiss Amateur Frequencies (7", 2002) – Gameboy Records
Some Cat Lost in His Own Picture (7", 2004) – Memoirs of an Aesthete
You Cannot Tell Cigars By the Picture on the Box (CD, 2004) – Celebrate Psi Phenomenon
Blues Power Cake (CDr, 2005) – Memoirs of an Aesthete
Deader Neptune Thunder Creating East (CD, 2005) – Memoirs of an Aesthete
A Monument to the British Rock (CDr, 2006) – Memoirs of an Aesthete
Strawberries and Ice (3" CDr, 2006) Memoirs of an Aesthete
Dirt Mummies and Bloody Amps (CD, 2006) – Freenoise
Four More Raga Moods (CD, 2006) – Ikuisuus Records
Who's Been Rocking My Dream-Boat? (Cdr reissue of 1996 cassette, 2006) – Memoirs of an Aesthete
Stranded in the Tea/Standing in the Tea  -(cassette, 2006) Fargone Records
Throw Up in the Sky/With Fine Clinking Magnets – (12" LP, 2007) Qbico Records
Caeduceus and Black Sal (CDr, 2007) – Memoirs of an Aesthete
Running on Autokinetic (CDr, 2007) – Memoirs of an Aesthete
Those Are Pearls That Were His Eyes (CDr reissue, 2007) – Revival
Throw Up in the Sky (12", 2007) – Qbico Records
Greatest Imaginary Band (CDr, 2007) – Self-released
Snakestrings / Hollywood Taught you How to Kiss (Double CDr, 2008) – Self-released
The Cream Wheel (CDr, 2008) – Self-released
Sugar Head Record (CDr, 2009) – Deep Water Acres

References

External links
 Official band website
 Interview with Ashtray Navigations
  Dutch interview, 2006

Musical groups from Staffordshire
Music in Stoke-on-Trent
English experimental musical groups
Siltbreeze Records artists